The Wandering Princess  is a 1960 Japanese romantic drama film directed by Kinuyo Tanaka, based on the memoir of Hiro Saga. The film was Tanaka's first to be in color. The film was processed by Technicolor.

Cast

Machiko Kyō	... 	Ryuko (Hiroko Aishinkakura)
Eiji Funakoshi	... 	Futetsu (Fuketsu Aishinkakura)
Yomei Ryu	... 	Fubun (Fugi Aishinkakura)
Sadako Sawamura	... 	Kazuko Sugawara
Shozo Nanbu	... 	Hidesato Sugawara
Chieko Higashiyama	... 	Nao Sugawara
Ryozo Yoshii	... 	Kosuke Takahashi
Kiyoko Hirai	... 	Tsuruko Takahashi
Tatsuya Ishiguro	... 	Furuya
Ken Mitsuda	... 	Asabuki
Mitsuko Mito	... 	Izumi
Chishū Ryū	... 	Kinoshita

External links 
 

1960 films
Films directed by Kinuyo Tanaka
1960s Japanese-language films
1960 romantic drama films
Japanese romantic drama films
1960s Japanese films